The Bureau for Paranormal Research and Defense (the B.P.R.D. or BPRD) is a fictional organization in the comic book work of Mike Mignola, founded by the United States and United Kingdom governments, charged with researching the occult, paranormal and supernatural, and defending against their dangers. The B.P.R.D. originally appeared in the Hellboy comics and has since been a major part of its expanded universe.

In 2002, Dark Horse Comics launched the B.P.R.D. comic series, and in 2014 the Hellboy and the B.P.R.D. series.

Fictional organization history
The B.P.R.D. was founded in 1945 by Professor Trevor Bruttenholm to combat various occult threats uncovered in operations against Nazi Germany. It initially had strong links to the United States Army Air Forces and was based at a military airbase in New Mexico, but in 1947 later relocated to a custom built facility in Fairfield, Connecticut. It maintains strong links to various branches of the US military to this day. It is a private organization that receives funding from several major governments (mostly the United States and United Kingdom, although other countries including Canada, Japan, France, and Italy have been mentioned).

Professor Bruttenholm served as director until the late 1950s when he stepped down to return to field work. The current director is Dr. Thomas Manning. Over the years, the Bureau has added several agents with "enhanced skills" to its ranks including Hellboy in 1952, Liz Sherman in 1980, and Abe Sapien in 1981.

The B.P.R.D. is a well known and respected organization that has excellent relations with most international governments and United States government agencies, with the exceptions of China and the CIA.

The Plague of Frogs Cycle
The Bureau was the United States' only defense against an onslaught of frog creatures (originally featured in Seed of Destruction). Though the "frogs" began operating on the East Coast, they spread west on both sides of the US-Canada border. To cut costs, the Bureau moved from its traditional headquarters in Connecticut to an abandoned research facility in Colorado. This facility was last used to house Nazi scientists who defected to America after World War II. As such, the facility contains vast quantities of secret files that the B.P.R.D. has yet to explore.

The frog monster invasion reached its peak during the events of The Black Flame during which a Neo-Nazi madman adopted the persona of the World War II era supervillain the Black Flame and insinuated himself as the leader of the frogs. Together they raised the gigantic Katha-Hem (one of the Ogdru Hem, the 369 spawn of the Ogdru Jahad) which ran rampant across the American heartland until Liz Sherman used an ancient artifact to amplify her pyrokinetic powers a thousandfold. After Katha-Hem was destroyed, the frog monsters dragged the Black Flame into a vast pit and the invasion appeared to come to an end.

A series of incidents—featured in The Warning, The Black Goddess, and King of Fear—saw the Bureau threatened by both an alliance of the frogs, the Black Flame, and creatures from the Hollow Earth, united to bring about an apocalypse and the birth of a new human race; and also the villain Memnan Saa, who abducted Liz in an attempt to use her powers to conquer the Earth so he could prevent the Apocalypse. This crisis saw half of Munich destroyed, the Bureau discredited in the eyes of the American military, and Abe Sapien revealed to be an example of the next stage of the frog's evolution. Finally, Liz Sherman exhausted all of her powers in destroying the underworld alliance. This inadvertently caused massive volcanic disasters across the world, devastating Malaysia and causing the destruction of Borneo (wiping out the nations of Indonesia and Brunei), and also causing the rise of a large, immobile monster in California, spewing out a gas across America and Mexico that mutates people. In the wake of this new crisis, the United Nations Security Council drafted the Bureau to work directly for them, with "blank cheque" funding.

A vision of the future shown in King of Fear showed the apocalypse had triumphed over this larger, more heavily armed B.P.R.D.

The Hell on Earth Cycle

In the wake of the events of King of Fear, the world enters an apocalyptic era as natural disasters and vicious monsters crawl out of the Earth. Society is pushed to the brink of madness as many new cults arise to worship the creatures, while other supernatural forces begin shifting their plans in response to the global chaos. The B.P.R.D. agents face their own struggles during this time - Johann claims revenge on Ben Daimio for the destruction of his new body, while Abe is shot in the head by a panicked psychic girl named Fenix. Fortunately for the B.P.R.D., they gain new allies as well in the form of the Russian Special Sciences Service (S.S.S.), with their director Iosif Nichayko. 

Unfortunately, Zinco and the last remnants of Project Ragnarok inadvertently resurrect a new and more powerful Black Flame, who proceeds to take control of New York and reawaken many slumbering Ogdru Hem all over the globe. Abe recovers from his near-fatal wound in time to see the world in an even worse state than last he saw, and he goes AWOL from the B.P.R.D. to go on a journey of self-discovery. Liz regains her powers and rejoins the B.P.R.D., while Johann transfers his spirit into the WWII Sledgehammer suit and together they fight the Ogdru Hem as they run rampant. Eventually they take on the new Black Flame in New York, but their victory only proves hollow as one of the seven Ogdru Jahad lands in Kansas, spawning an army of Ogdru Hem as it tears its way across the land. Johann ends up sacrificing himself to defeat the dragon, paralyzing all the Ogdru Hem around the world and giving the world a moment of peaceful respite.

B.P.R.D. Agents

Enhanced Talents Taskforce
 Hellboy/Anung Un Rama, Cambion (a half-Demon)
 Abraham Sapien, amphibious man
 Elizabeth Sherman, pyrokinetic
 Roger the Homunculus, artificial human
 Johann Kraus, ectoplasmic physical medium  
 Captain Benjamin Daimio, were-jaguar 
 Panya, ageless mummy
 Fenix Espejo, psychic
 Ted Howards (Gall Dennar), warrior with a Hyperborean sword
 Susan Xiang, psychic  
 Josephine T. Gant, psychic   
 Garrett Omatta, psychic

Human Agents
 Professor Trevor Bruttenholm, former director (deceased)
 Dr. Tom Manning, director
 Dr. Kate Corrigan, liaison to enhanced talents agents
 Dr. Howard Eaton, occult specialist, assistant to Prof. Bruttenholm 
 Professor James Henry O'Donnell, occult specialist
 Andrew Devon, field agent
 Sal Tasso, field agent
 Carla Giarocco, field agent
 Ashley Strode, exorcist and field agent
 Pauline Raskin, former field agent
 Joseph Vaughn, field agent
 Rebecca Gervesh, field agent
 Agent Nichols, field agent
 Agent Enos, field agent
 Rachel Turner, London field agent

Allies
 Sir Edward Grey, Witchfinder, a witch hunter who had his own spin-off series
 Lobster Johnson, a vigilante ghost
 Michael Mathers, also known as The Visitor, an extraterrestrial assassin sent to Earth to kill Hellboy
 Alice Monaghan, a young woman, who was kidnapped by fairies as a baby, then saved by Hellboy, retained some magical abilities and now works as a psychic
 Iosif Nichayko, a Russian zombie super soldier and Director of the Russian Special Sciences Service
 Daryl Tynon, a human hunter who was turned into a wendigo
 Varvara, a little girl possessed by a demon and former director of the Special Sciences Service

Publication history

The Bureau made its first appearance in the pages of the Hellboy miniseries Hellboy: Seed of Destruction (4 issues, March–June 1994) and was a major part of the comic until Hellboy leaves the B.P.R.D. at the end of Conqueror Worm. At this point the B.P.R.D. series began, following the agents of the B.P.R.D. such as Abe Sapien, Liz Sherman, Roger and Johann Krauss.

B.P.R.D. was once considered a "series of miniseries", with each story reading as a stand-alone story easily enough, but over time, an overarching story began to develop. When a new story cycle began, the series was retitled B.P.R.D.: Hell on Earth, then two years later when the series hit its 100th issue, it was restructured as an ongoing monthly comic. This was done for many reasons, most notably to make the reading order simpler to the uninitiated.

Stories
B.P.R.D. began as a series of miniseries, but it also had an ongoing numbering on the inside cover of its issues. For the 100th issue the internal numbering shifted to the front cover as the series became a monthly ongoing comic.

Collected editions

B.P.R.D. trade paperbacks
Most of the B.P.R.D. comics have been collected by Dark Horse as trade paperbacks:

B.P.R.D. Vampire trade paperbacks
In all ways this appears to be another regular B.P.R.D. trade save for the details on the spine that indicate it is the first in a new line. Only one has been published so far, but there are plans for more in the future.

B.P.R.D. Hell on Earth trade paperbacks
There is also a series of trade paperbacks collecting the Hell on Earth cycle:

B.P.R.D. The Devil You Know trade paperbacks

There is also a series of trade paperbacks collecting The Devil You Know cycle:

Omnibus editions
Dark Horse have also released a series of omnibus editions:

In other media

Films
The Bureau appeared in the 2004 film Hellboy and its 2008 sequel Hellboy II: The Golden Army, both directed by Guillermo del Toro, where it differs from the agency in the comics. 
In the film it is a secret United States Government agency, created by Roosevelt to combat Hitler's growing mastery of the occult, and strongly affiliated with the FBI. Professor Bruttenholm claims that the BPRD fought the Occult Wars that ended in 1958 with the death of Adolf Hitler.
Several personnel are federal agents, including Manning and new character Special Agent John Myers whilst the director is still Professor Bruttenholm, who refers to the bureau as "the ones who bump back", in reference to "things that go bump in the night".
The BPRD uses the motto "In Absentia Luci, Tenebrae Vincunt", Latin for "In the Absence of Light, Darkness Prevails"—though this motto is grammatically incorrect—Luci should read "Lucis" for the desired meaning.
In Hellboy II: The Golden Army, the Bureau's existence is confirmed when Hellboy reveals himself to the media after battling vicious tooth-fairies. The film reveals there is a German branch where Johann was stationed until he became the new director of the US branch.
 In the 2019 reboot, the Bureau is a public multinational agency.
It is hinted that the base may be related to military base Area 51 as the number 51 appears on the walls.

Television
The B.P.R.D. Declassified was a TV special that aired on the FX in 2004.

Roleplaying game
The B.P.R.D. appeared in the Hellboy Sourcebook and Role Playing Game.

In popular culture
 In the film Blade II, Blade's young assistant, Scud, wears a shirt bearing the B.P.R.D. logo. Guillermo del Toro, who directed Blade II, is a fan of Hellboy, and later he directed the film adaptation and its sequel.
 In the comic shop in The Big Bang Theory, the B.P.R.D. comic is prominently and repeatedly featured.
 In the show Hawaii 5-0 a B.P.R.D. Hell on Earth: New World poster is on the wall of Dr. Max Bergman's (played by Masi Oka) apartment.

See also
Similar organizations
Bureau 13
Vector 13
Delta Green
SCP Foundation

References

External links 

Hellboy
Dark Horse Comics titles
Horror comics
2002 comics debuts
Characters created by Mike Mignola
Fictional government investigations of the paranormal
Fictional paranormal investigators
Fictional occult and psychic detectives